Stronach may refer to:

 Stronach (surname)
 Iselsberg-Stronach, a municipality in Tyrol, Austria
 Stronach Township, Michigan, U.S.
Stronach Group, a gambling and horse racing company in North America
 Stronach Stables, a North American Thoroughbred horse racing arm 
 Team Stronach, a defunct political party in Austria
 Stronachlachar, a hamlet in Scotland